The 2022–23 Danish Cup, also known as Pokalen, is the 69th season of the Danish Cup competition. The winner will qualify for the Europa Conference League second qualifying round.

Structure
92 teams participate in the first round, coming from all levels of competition. Six additional teams will join in the second round, while the top six teams from the 2021–22 Danish Superliga enter in the third round.

Participants
104 teams will compete for the Danish Cup. All teams from the top three divisions in 2021–22 were automatically entered, while 54 teams from lower division teams qualified through qualifying matches to enter the competition proper.

First round
There was 92 teams:
 54 teams from the qualifying rounds
 10 teams from 2021–22 Danish 3rd Division 
Dalum IF
FC Roskilde
BK Frem
IF Lyseng
Næsby BK
VSK Aarhus
Karlslunde IF
KFUM Roskilde
Vanløse IF
Young Boys FD
 12 teams from 2021–22 Danish 2nd Division
Aarhus Fremad
AB Gladsaxe
B.93
Brabrand IF
FA 2000
HIK
Hillerød Fodbold
Kolding IF
Middelfart G&BK
Næstved BK
Skive IK
Thisted FC
 10 teams from 2021–22 Danish 1st Division
FC Fredericia
FC Helsingør
Hvidovre IF
Nykøbing FC
Esbjerg fB
Fremad Amager
HB Køge
Hobro IK
Jammerbugt FC
Vendsyssel FF
 2 teams from 2021–22 Danish Superliga
SønderjyskE
Vejle
In the first round of the tournament, 92 teams took part, including 54 clubs from the various levels of the Denmark Series and below, 10 out of 12 clubs from the Danish 3rd Division and all from Danish 2nd Division, the 3rd-12th placed teams from the 2021-22 Danish 1st Division and the 11th-12th placed teams from the 2021-22 Danish Superliga.
Teams are split into three regions:
Zealand/Bornholm/Falster/Lolland (44 teams)
Fyn/Southern Jutland (24 teams)
Middle/Northern Jutland (24 teams)

Zealand/Bornholm/Falster/Lolland

Fyn/Southern Jutland

Middle/Northern Jutland

Second round
There was 52 teams:

 46 teams from the 1st round (winners)
Tier 2: FC Helsingør, Nykøbing FC, Fremad Amager, HB Køge, SønderjyskE, FC Fredericia, Vejle Boldklub, Hobro IK, Vendsyssel FF
Tier 3: FC Roskilde, BK Frem, Næstved BK, AB, Kolding IF, Brabrand IF, Skive IK, Aarhus Fremad, Thisted FC
Tier 4: Vanløse IF, BK Frem, Ishøj IF FA 2000, SfB-Oure FA, Middelfart BK, Næsby BK, Young Boys FD 
Tier 5: Allerød FK, Karlslunde IF, Brønshøj BK, Tårnby FF, Varde IF, Hedensted IF, BK Marienlyst, Viby IF, Ringkøbing IF 
Tier 6: Tuse IF, BSF, Hørsholm-Usserød IK, FC Nakskov, Sædding-Guldager IF, Kerteminde BK, Vatanspor, Frederikshavn fI
Tier 7, 8 & 9: Kastrup BK Jyllinge FC, FC Culpa, Klitmøller IF
 4 teams from the 2021–22 Danish Superliga (7th–10th placed)
AGF
Nordsjælland 
OB
Viborg
 The 2021–22 Danish 1st Division champions and runners-up
AC Horsens
Lyngby Boldklub

West

East

Third round
There was 32 teams:

 26 teams from the 2nd round (winners)
Tier 1: Viborg FF, AC Horsens, Nordsjælland, AGF
Tier 2: FC Helsingør, Næstved BK, Fremad Amager, HB Køge, Vejle Boldklub, SønderjyskE, Vendsyssel FF, Hobro IK, Nykøbing FC
Tier 3: Aarhus Fremad, Thisted FC, AB, Brabrand IF, FC Roskilde
Tier 4: Middelfart BK, Ishøj IF, Næsby BK, FA 2000, Vanløse IF
Tier 5: None
Tier 6: Hørsholm-Usserød IK, Sædding-Guldager IF, BSF
 6 teams from the 2021–22 Danish Superliga (1st–6th placed)
AaB
Brøndby
Copenhagen
Midtjylland
Randers
Silkeborg

Fourth round
There was 16 teams from the 3rd round (winners).
Tier 1: Silkeborg IF, FC Nordsjælland, AGF, AaB, Viborg FF, FC Midtjylland, F.C. Copenhagen, AC Horsens, Randers FC
Tier 2: Vejle BK, Nykøbing FC, SønderjyskE, Fremad Amager
Tier 3: Thisted FC, Aarhus Fremad
Tier 4: Middelfart BK 

The draw was held on 21 October 2022.

Quarter-finals 
There will be 8 teams from the 4th round (winners) playing two legs:
Tier 1: AaB, F.C. Copenhagen, Silkeborg IF, Viborg FF, FC Nordsjælland
Tier 2: SønderjyskE, Vejle BK 
Tier 3: Aarhus Fremad

Semi-finals 
There will be 4 teams from the Quarter-final (winners) playing two legs:
Tier 1: 
Tier 2: 
Tier 3:

Final 
There will be 2 teams from the Semi-final (winners).
The winner will qualify for the Europa Conference League second qualifying round

References

External links

2022-23
2022–23 European domestic association football cups
Cup